Ataxin-2 is a protein that in humans is encoded by the ATXN2 gene. Mutations in ATXN2 cause spinocerebellar ataxia type 2 (SCA2).

Protein structure 
Ataxin-2 contains the following protein domains:
 Two LSm domains, which likely allow it to bind RNA
 A PAM2 motif, predicted to associate with the poly(A)-binding protein
 A polyglutamine tract in some species (located near the amino terminal in primates and between the LSm domains in insects)
A potential transcript variant, missing an internal coding exon, has been described; however, its full-length nature is not certain.

Species, tissue, and subcellular distribution 
ATXN2 is conserved across eukaryotes. Most vertebrates have two orthologs of the gene (called ATXN2 and ATXN2L in humans), with the exception of birds which only have one. Plant species have two to six ATXN2 orthologs.

ATXN2 is ubiquitously expressed in different tissues. Within individual cells, it localizes to the Golgi apparatus and stress granules.

Function 

Ataxin-2 is involved in regulating mRNA translation through its interactions with the poly(A)-binding protein. It is also involved in the formation of stress granules and P-bodies, which also play roles in RNA regulation.

Clinical significance

Spinocerebellar ataxia type 2 (SCA2) 
The polyglutamine tract in human ataxin-2 is unstable and can expand as it is transmitted across generations.  Normal alleles usually have 22 or 23 repeats, but can contain up to 31 repeats. Longer expansions can cause spinocerebellar ataxia type 2 (SCA2), a fatal progressive genetic disorder in which neurons degenerate in the cerebellum, inferior olive, pons, and other areas. Symptoms of SCA2 include ataxia (a loss of coordinated movements), parkinsonism, and dementia in some cases. The disease allele usually contains 34-52 CAG repeats, but can contain as few as 32 or more than 100, and can expand in size when transmitted to successive generations. How the polyglutamine expansion in ataxin-2 leads to these symptoms is unknown.

Amyotrophic lateral sclerosis (ALS) 
In 2010, work from Aaron Gitler and Nancy Bonini at the University of Pennsylvania discovered that intermediate-size CAG repeat expansions are significantly associated with risk for developing amyotrophic lateral sclerosis (Lou Gehrig's disease).

Primary open-angle glaucoma (POAG) and intraocular pressure (IOP) 
Genome-wide association studies have revealed a significant association of ATXN2 variants with POAG and IOP. Further investigation of the genetic and biological mechanisms underlying the association between ATXN2 and POAG could provide valuable insights into the pathogenesis and potential therapeutic targets for glaucoma.

References

Further reading

External links 
  GeneReviews/NIH/NCBI/UW entry on Spinocerebellar Ataxia Type 2